Herne is a surname, sometimes an alternative spelling of Hern and Hearn. Notable people with the surname include:

Chrystal Herne (1883–1950), American actress
Frank Herne (born 1989), South African rugby union player
James A. Herne (1839–1901), American playwright and actor
Phil Herne (born 1955), Australian motorcycle speedway rider
Thomas Herne (died 1722), English academic and writer
Jeffrey Herne (born 1968), Grifter, Montauk Tribal Elder